The Christmas Show, formerly known as The John Bishop Show, is a British comedy-variety show presented by stand-up comedian John Bishop at the Hackney Empire Theatre. The show has aired on BBC One from 30 May to 18 July 2015.

Another show, also titled The John Bishop Show began on ITV in January 2022.

Episodes

John Bishop's Christmas Show

References

External links

2010s British comedy television series
2015 British television series debuts
2015 British television series endings
BBC television comedy
BBC high definition shows
English-language television shows
British variety television shows